Bilshivtsi is an urban-type settlement in Ivano-Frankivsk Raion in Ivano-Frankivsk Oblast. Between 1940 and 1963 it was the center of a raion. Bilshivtsi hosts the administration of Bilshivtsi settlement hromada, one of the hromadas of Ukraine.

Location 
Bilshivtsi is located at the confluence of the Narayivka River and the Hnyla Lypa River, a tributary of the Dniester. It is 3 kilometers to the east of the LvivIvano-Frankivsk road and 8 kilometers north of the Halych train station.

History 
Between 1772 and 1918 it was part of Austrian Galicia. After the end of World War I Bilshivtsi became part of  Rohatyn Powiat in Stanisławów Voivodeship, part of Poland. In 1939 it was annexed by the Soviet Union.

Bilshivtsi was occupied by German troops during World War II from 1941 to 1944. In 1943, more than 1,000 local Jewish residents were shot by German troops.

Until 18 July 2020, Bilshivtsi belonged to Halych Raion. The raion was abolished in July 2020 as part of the administrative reform of Ukraine, which reduced the number of raions of Ivano-Frankivsk Oblast to six. The area of Halych Raion was merged into Ivano-Frankivsk Raion.

References 

Urban-type settlements in Ivano-Frankivsk Raion
Holocaust locations in Ukraine